Deepwater drilling, or deep well drilling, is the process of creating holes in the Earth's crust using a drilling rig for oil extraction under the deep sea. There are approximately 3400 deepwater wells in the Gulf of Mexico with depths greater than 150 meters.

Deepwater drilling has not been technologically or economically feasible for many years, but with rising oil prices, more companies are investing in this sector. Major investors include Halliburton, Diamond Offshore, Transocean, Geoservices, and Schlumberger. The deepwater gas and oil market has been back on the rise since the 2010 Deepwater Horizon disaster, with total expenditures of around US$35 billion per year in the market and total global capital expenditures of US$167 billion in the past four years. Industry analysis by business intelligence company Visiongain estimated in 2011 that total expenditures in global deepwater infrastructure would reach US$145 billion.

A HowStuffWorks article explains how and why deepwater drilling is practiced:

In the Deepwater Horizon oil spill of 2010, a large explosion occurred, killing workers and spilling oil into the Gulf of Mexico while a BP oil rig was drilling in deep waters.

History

Some of the earliest evidence of water wells are located in China.  The Chinese discovered and made extensive use of deep drilled groundwater for drinking. The Chinese text The Book of Changes, originally a divination text of the Western Zhou dynasty (1046 -771 BC), contains an entry describing how the ancient Chinese maintained their wells and protected their sources of water. Archaeological evidence and old Chinese documents reveal that the prehistoric and ancient Chinese had the aptitude and skills for digging deep water wells for drinking water as early as 6000 to 7000 years ago. A well excavated at the Hemedu excavation site was believed to have been built during the Neolithic era. The well was cased by four rows of logs with a square frame attached to them at the top of the well. 60 additional tile wells southwest of Beijing are also believed to have been built around 600 BC for drinking and irrigation.

Types of deepwater drilling facilities
Drilling in deep waters can be performed by two main types of mobile deepwater drilling rigs: semi-submersible drilling rigs and drillships. Drilling can also be performed from a fixed-position installation such as a fixed platform, or a floating platform, such as a spar platform, a tension-leg platform, or a semi-submersible production platform.
 Fixed Platform - A Fixed Platform consists of a tall, (usually) steel structure that supports a deck. Because the Fixed Platform is anchored to the sea floor, it is very costly to build.
 Jack-Up Rig - Jack-up rigs are mobile units with a floating hull that can be moved around; once they arrived at the desired location, the legs are lowered to the seafloor and locked into place. Then the platform is raised up out of the water. That makes this type of rig safer to work on because weather and waves are not an issue.
 Compliant Tower Platform - A compliant tower is a particular type of fixed platform. Both are anchored to the seafloor, and both workplaces are above the water surface. However, the compliant tower is taller and narrower and can operate up to 1 kilometer (3,000 feet) water depth.
 Semi-Submersible Production Platform - This platform is buoyant, meaning the bulk of it is floating above the surface. However, the well head is typically located on the seafloor, so extra precautions must be taken to prevent a leak. A contributing cause to the oil spill disaster of 2010 was a failure of the leak-preventing system.
 Tension-Leg Platform - The Tension-leg Platform consists of a floating structure, held in place by tendons that run down to the seafloor. These rigs drill smaller deposits in narrower areas, meaning this is a low-cost way to get a little oil, which attracts many companies.
 Subsea System - Subsea Systems are actually wellheads, which sit on the seafloor and extract oil straight from the ground. They use pipes to force the oil back up to the surface, and can siphon oil to nearby platform rigs, a ship overhead, a local production hub, or even a faraway onshore site. This makes the Subsea system very versatile and a popular choice for companies.
 Spar Platform - Spar Platforms use a large cylinder to support the floating deck from the seafloor. On average, about 90% of the Spar Platform's structure is underwater. That makes it one of the deepest drilling rigs in use today.

2010 Deepwater Horizon oil spill

On 20 April 2010, a BP deepwater oil rig (Deepwater Horizon) exploded, killing 11 and releasing 750,000 cubic meters (200 million gallons) of oil into the Gulf of Mexico. With those numbers, many scientists consider this disaster to be one of the worst environmental disasters in the history of the US.

A large number of animal deaths have resulted from the release of the oil. A Center study estimates that over 82,000 birds, about 6,000 sea turtles, and nearly 26,000 marine mammals were killed from either the initial explosion or the oil spill.

See also
General Offshore drilling, Well drilling, Shallow water drilling, Extraction of petroleum, Age of Oil, Fossil fuel drilling (disambiguation), Energy development, Hubbert peak theory
Other 2010 United States deepwater drilling moratorium, Submersible pump, IntelliServ, Petroleum industry in Mexico, Deepwater Horizon
People Michael Klare, Jason Leopold

References

External articles
  Deepwater Drilling: How It Works | Chevron | Video. chevron.com.
 HowStuffWorks "Ultra Deep Water Oil Drilling". science.howstuffworks.com.
 Rigzone - Deepwater Gulf of Mexico Drilling Activity to Keep Rising. rigzone.com. April 24, 2013.

Chinese inventions
Petroleum production
Petroleum industry